The National Alliance (NA), officially the National Alliance "All for Latvia!" – "For Fatherland and Freedom/LNNK", is a national-conservative and right-wing populist political party in Latvia. A right-wing party, it has also been placed as the far right, or radical right, of the political spectrum. It is economic liberal.

It was formed as an electoral alliance for the 2010 Latvian parliamentary election between the For Fatherland and Freedom/LNNK and All for Latvia! parties. It won eight seats, placing it fourth among all parties. In July 2011, it merged into a single political party under the leadership of Gaidis Bērziņš and Raivis Dzintars. In the 2014 Latvian parliamentary election, it again increased its seats to seventeen, and entered a centre-right coalition, along with Unity and the Union of Greens and Farmers under Prime Minister Laimdota Straujuma.

It has participated in every government of Latvia since the 2011 Latvian parliamentary election to prevent Harmony Centre from leading the coalition. It is also a member of the European Conservatives and Reformists Party (ERC) and its two MEPs, Roberts Zīle and Dace Melbārde, sit in the ERC group in the European Parliament. The party controls the town and city governments of Ogre, Bauska, Smiltene, Sigulda, and Talsi.

History
It was founded as an electoral alliance in 2010 by the national-conservative For Fatherland and Freedom/LNNK and the far-right All for Latvia! after the two parties were refused entry into the Unity alliance. The loose alliance was transformed into a unitary party on 23 July 2011. In the 2010 Latvian parliamentary election, the alliance won 8 seats. As part of the outgoing government, it was involved in negotiations after the election to renew the coalition but was vetoed by the Society for Political Change, which had not been part of the government but had joined the Unity alliance.

In May 2011, the party supported the re-election of Valdis Zatlers in the 2011 Latvian presidential election. The alliance became a single united party on 23 July 2011.  At the 2011 Latvian parliamentary election, the National Alliance won fourteen seats, an increase of six on the previous year, making it the fourth-largest party in the Saeima. After extensive negotiations with an aim to avoid Kremlin supporting powers from gaining seats in government, it joined a centre-right government with Unity and Zatlers' Reform Party, with the party's Gaidis Bērziņš as Minister for Justice and Žaneta Jaunzeme-Grende as Minister for Culture.

On 23 August 2013, All for Latvia! wing of National Alliance signed the Bauska Declaration together with the Conservative People's Party of Estonia and Lithuanian Nationalist and Republican Union calling for a new national awakening of the Baltic states and warning about perceived threats posed by cultural Marxism, "postmodernistic multiculturalism", "destructive liberalism", and Russian imperialism. The merging period of the two founding parties was ended on the National Alliance's third congress on 7 December 2013, finally creating one unitary party.

In 2014 Latvian parliamentary election, the party gained 17 seats and entered a centre-right coalition, along with Unity and the Union of Greens and Farmers under Prime Minister Laimdota Straujuma. The party succeeded to include several points in the Declaration of the government and coalition treaty, such as to begin gradual Latvianization of the bilingual educational system starting from 2018; to limit the residence permit acquisition programme established in 2010, increase state support to family values and the demography programme; to make national identity, Latvian language, and Latvian culture as a priority as it is defined in the Constitution of Latvia; opening of natural gas market in order to end the Gazprom monopoly in the Latvian energy market; veto rights to any decision which could weaken the positions of the Latvian language.

After the 2018 Latvian parliamentary election, in which the party won 13 seats, Arturs Krišjānis Kariņš was tasked by Latvian President Raimonds Vējonis with forming the next government following the failures of previous nominees Bordāns and Gobzems in a contentious negotiation process. Kariņš took office as Prime Minister on 23 January 2019, leading a broad centre-right coalition of five conservative and liberal parties (Kariņš cabinet) that included National Alliance, along with Development/For!, New Conservative Party, Kariņš' Unity, and Who Owns the State? parties.

Ideology and policies
The National Alliance is a national-conservative party, as well as socially conservative. It has also been described as right-wing populist or nationalist, and placed on the right wing to far right,  or radical right, of the political spectrum. In its platform, the party lists its core priorities as protecting Latvian language, culture, and heritage. An economic liberal party, it takes a pro-West stance in foreign policy, supports economic reform to promote business competition, and calls for a "non-taxable minimum pension" for all citizens. In 2021, the party submitted to the Saeima a draft law regarding an amendment to the Constitution, which intends to strictly define the concept of family as a union of a male and a female person.

It has taken right-wing populist positions, and it actively opposes immigration, both the residence permit selling programme and the refugee quota system intended by the European Union (EU), emphasizing the already large number of Soviet-era settlers in Latvia. It has compared the modern advocates of immigration with those who supported the planned mass immigration to the Latvian Soviet Socialist Republic, which affected the demographic ethnic groups in Latvia, such as the expansion of a Russian minority. The party was the only one of the leading coalition partners that completely refused both the refugee quota system, as well as voluntary acceptation of refugees. In August 2015, the party took part in organizing the massive anti-immigration rally in Rīga. This anti-immigration position was accented in the annual foreign affair debates in the Saeima, also turning against perceived liberal immigration policy and political correctness in the EU. The party supports the establishment of a national day of remembrance for the Latvian Legion, a military formation within Nazi Germany's Waffen-SS. The Saeima has rejected proposals by the National Alliance to formally establish it as a holiday in 2013, 2018, and 2019. MPs from the National Alliance are regular participants in the annual commemoration events for the Latvian Legion.

In foreign policy, the party wants to participate in what it calls the "Western geopolitical space". It supports Latvian membership of NATO. The party takes a Eurosceptic, or what they describe as Eurorealist, stance towards the EU, by opposing bureaucracy and centralization of powers around Brussels, arguing that the EU should be limited to a trading block as opposed to a bureaucratic political organization, and that member states must work to fight crime and defend European culture together but not impose on domestic decision making and political sovereignty of nations, and abandon what the party calls the EU's "everything for all" approach. Following Brexit, the National Alliance stated that the UK's decision must be respected and the country needs to remain an important ally of Europe and Latvia, and that the EU must not retaliate against Britain and instead pursue a free trade agreement with Britain. Since the beginning of the Russo-Ukrainian War, the party has taken a pro-Ukrainian position and suggested a stricter anti-Kremlin position for the Latvian government, as well as the Council of Europe.

Election results

Legislative elections

Riga City Council

European Parliament

See also

List of political parties in Latvia

Literature

References

External links
 Official website 
 Short film "Latwis" about the mission of the National Alliance 

Political parties in Latvia
Latvian nationalism
Conservative parties in Latvia
Political parties established in 2010
Alliance of Conservatives and Reformists in Europe member parties
European Conservatives and Reformists member parties
Euroscepticism in Latvia
Defunct political party alliances in Latvia
Nationalist parties in Latvia
National conservative parties
2010 establishments in Latvia
Right-wing populism in Latvia
Right-wing populist parties
Social conservative parties
Right-wing parties in Europe